A by-election was held on 26 January 2019 for the Dewan Rakyat seat of Cameron Highlands. The seat became vacant after the Election Court on 30 November 2018 declared the incumbent Barisan Nasional (BN) Member of Parliament of Malaysian Indian Congress (MIC) Dato' Sivarraajh Chandran's victory in the seat null and void because it was found that corrupt practices were committed in the 14th general election. The court found Sivarraajh guilty of bribing of between RM30 and RM1,000 to the Orang Asli community voters prior to the election as established beyond reasonable doubt in the election petition filed by the Democratic Action Party (DAP) candidate M. Manogaran.

This was the fifth national and the second parliamentary by-election to be called since the historic 2018 general election, which saw the first-ever change of federal government in Malaysia's history. Polling for this by-election was held on 26 January 2019 (Saturday), with nomination day on 12 January and early voting on 22 January. Overseas voting was opened for registration from 19 December 2018 and closed on 11 January 2019.

Barisan Nasional's direct member candidate Ramli Mohd Nor won the by-election. He was the first indigenous Orang Asli candidate elected into the Dewan Rakyat. (Ramli would later join one of the coalition's constituent parties, United Malays National Organisation (UMNO) as its member.)

The by-election had the highest turnout than any other by-election after the 14th General Elections.

Demographics 

The electoral roll used was as of the third quarter of 2018, updated on 14 December. There were a total of 32,009 registered voters, including 247 early voters and 12 absentee voters. There are also 385 disabled voters.

The constituency electorate breakdown are Malay 33.5%; Chinese 29.48%; Indian 14.91%;  Orang Asli (Peninsular Malaysia) 21.56%; Bumiputera Sabah 0.12%; Bumiputera Sarawak 0.06%; Others 0.37%.

Cameron Highlands district officer Datuk Ishak Md Napis was the returning officer for the by-election. A total of 811 election officers handled the by-election in 31 polling centres, with an allocation of RM3.5 million. The nomination centre and vote-tallying centre was the Gemilang Hall of Sekolah Menengah Kebangsaan Sultan Ahmad Shah.

Vote-tallying process and results announcement of the by-election were also broadcast live to the public for a historic first time on Election Commission (EC)’s social media platforms such as Facebook and Instagram.

Nomination 
BN initially planned to continue to let MIC field a candidate for the by-election and the Malaysian Chinese Association (MCA) has pledges to assist MIC in Cameron Highlands by-election. But somehow BN on 10 January announced that a BN direct member who is not a member from any BN component party; Ramli Mohd Noor as the coalition's candidate in the Cameron Highlands by-election. Ramli is a retired senior police officer with the rank of Assistant Commissioner of Police (ACP); who is a local indigenous Orang Asli of Semai tribe.

Pakatan Harapan (PH) had on 4 January picked and announced DAP's M. Manogaran as the candidate for the Cameron Highlands by-election.

The Pan-Malaysian Islamic Party (PAS) had announced that they would stay out of the by-election to support opposition candidate.

The in-turmoil People's Progressive Party (MyPPP) disputed president M. Kayveas had announced on 6 January he will be contesting for the party in the by-election. But on Nomination Day, he decided not to contest and supported the PH candidate instead.

Former BN component Parti Gerakan Rakyat Malaysia (Gerakan) on 11 January announced that it has decided to sit out the Cameron Highlands parliamentary by-election after earlier rumours that the party might field its Cameron Highlands deputy division chairperson Dr Eddie Edward Tharmaraj as the candidate in the by-election.

BN's Ramli Mohd Noor, PH's M. Manogaran and two independent candidates, Wong Seng Yee and Sallehudin Ab Talib, submitted their nomination papers on 12 January to set for a four-cornered fight on 26 January. Wong (hoe logo) is a farmer and a member of the Cameron Highlands Agricultural Cooperative Association, while Sallehudin (book logo) from Felda Sungai Koyan 1, is a former lecturer at Institut Aminuddin Baki.

Controversies and issues 
A voter Syazleen Anisa Misria who is a bride-to-be got panic realising that the school hall she had booked six months ago for her wedding was to be used as a voting centre on the same day when the by-election was announced. She took to express her despair and sadness of her dilemma situation as almost all her wedding preparations have been done in a post on the EC's Facebook page. Her post was quickly met with an immediate attention and reply by the admin of the EC Facebook page who request her contact details to discuss the matter further. Hours later Syazleen commented to her earlier post that she had been contacted by the EC and that her wedding has been brought forward by a week. She also mentioned EC will compensate her with some contribution and her hopes that the by-election and her wedding will be smoothly conducted beside her gratitude to the EC for their assistance.

The EC ruled on 28 December that MIC C. Sivarraajh is ineligible to re-contest the by-election as he was barred from becoming a candidate or voter in any election for the next five years beginning 13 December 2018 under Section 36(2)(a) and Section 37 of the Election Offences Act 1954. The High Court on 10 January dismisses Sivarraajh's bid to challenge EC decision over the five-year election ban.

PH candidate M. Manogaran had on 10 January apologised and expressed regrets for his insensitive remarks a day earlier citing the perception that "Malays don't even buy kuih from Orang Asli vendors" analogy regarding BN fielding an Orang Asli candidate.

Orang Asli Senator Bob Manolan Mohamad of People's Justice Party (PKR) clarified that his appeal to the Orang Asli village headmen (Tok Batin) in a dialogue between them earlier, to put aside political differences and work together with the Federal Government to better their villages in Cameron Highlands have been mistaken as "threats" allegedly made to them if they did not support PH they will not get paid and will be sacked. However the explanation was vague due to clear recording obtained containing his speech during the campaign.

BN candidate Ramli had refused to face the other three by-election candidates who already agreed to a live debate to be organised by Bersih 2.0. Ramli also had failed to sign a Bersih 2.0-organised pledges for a fair and clean by-election like the other candidates did.

There were photographs showing a woman clad in a PH T-shirt purportedly handing out money was widely shared on 13 January, which PH explains it was not bribes but just petrol reimbursements for their party volunteers.

Celebrity chef, Dato' Redzuawan Ismail or popularly known as Chef Wan, the son of a Federal Land Development Authority (Felda) settler, said he wants to slap former prime minister Najib Razak and ex-Felda chairman Mohd Isa Abdul Samad for mismanaging the agency into a financial mess while on a cooking programme and campaign trail for Felda settlers in Cameron Highlands on 20 January 2019.

A driver of the Raub Forest Department reported over the use of state government vehicles during the by-election campaign and defended his action of handing over the government vehicle to Deputy Water, Land and Natural Resources Minister Tengku Zulpuri Shah Raja Puji on 21 January 2019.

On Polling Day, M. Manogaran, wore a shirt bearing the party logo to a polling station against the election rules and he was then escorted out by the EC officer.

Result

Result according to polling district

N01 Tanah Rata

N02 Jelai

Post and Early votes

Previous result

References 

2019 elections in Malaysia
By-elections in Malaysia
Elections in Pahang